Ugly Duckling is the name of the show produced by the East West Theatre Company from Sarajevo in 2009. The play was based on Hans Christian Andersen’s 1843 fairy tale "The Ugly Duckling" and references ubiquitous problem of non-acceptance of  those who are “different” during the most vulnerable period in their development, that is, during the childhood. The show is aimed at children aged four to nine years and is directed by a director Elma Islamovic. The original cast involves the following actors: Maja Zećo, Emir Fejzić, Sanela Krsmanović, Amila Terzimehić, Adi Hrustemović, Enes Salković and a producer Nermin Hamzagić.

References

Theatre in Bosnia and Herzegovina
Culture in Sarajevo
Works based on The Ugly Duckling